The İğdir Tunnel, is a motorway tunnel constructed on the Bursa–Sivrihisar motorway   in Bursa Province, northwestern Turkey. It was opened to the traffic in 2005.

It is situated near İğdir village of Gürsu, Bursa. The tunnel was constructed by Yertaş Construction Company.

See also
 List of motorway tunnels in Turkey

References

External links
 Map of road tunnels in Turkey at General Directorate of Highways (Turkey) (KGM)

Road tunnels in Turkey
Buildings and structures in Bursa
Transport in Bursa Province
Transport in Bursa